is the second single of Hello! Project solo artist, Kaori Iida. It was released on July 28, 2004. Like her first single, it was released when she was still a member of the idol group, Morning Musume.

Track listing 
 
 Lyrics by Tokuko Miura, composition by Tsunku, arrangement by Kouji Makaino
 
 Lyrics by Tokuko Miura, composition by Tsunku, arrangement by Kouji Makaino
 Door no Mukō de Bell ga Natteta (Instrumental)

Charts

References

External links 
 Door no Mukō de Bell ga Natteta entry on the Up-Front Works official website 

Kaori Iida songs
Zetima Records singles
2004 singles
Songs written by Tsunku
Song recordings produced by Tsunku
2004 songs